The A. D. Hollindale Stakes is a Gold Coast Turf Club Group 2 Weight for Age Thoroughbred horse race for horses three years old and older, over a distance of 1,800 metres at Gold Coast Racecourse, Surfers Paradise, Queensland, Australia during the Queensland Winter Racing Carnival. Total prize money for the race is A$500,000.

History

The race is named in honour of Allan D. Hollindale, a cattle farmer, owner of the company Gold Coast Milk and former chairman of the Gold Coast Turf Club. The track also has a stand named after A.D. Hollindale.

Name
1989–1992 - Southport Cup
1993 onwards - A. D. Hollindale Stakes

Grade
1990–1992 - Listed race
1993–1996 - Group 3 race
1997 onwards - Group 2

Winners

 2022 - Zaaki
 2021 - Zaaki
 2020 - ‡race not held
 2019 - Life Less Ordinary
 2018 - Oregon's Day
 2017 - It's Somewhat
 2016 - Leebaz
 2015 - Leebaz
2014 - Streama
2013 - Lights of Heaven
2012 - Shez Sinsational
2011 - My Kingdom Of Fife
2010 - Metal Bender
2009 - Fulmonti
2008 - Scenic Shot
2007 - Coalesce
2006 - Above Deck
2005 - Platinum Scissors
2004 - This Manshood
2003 - Bush Padre
2002 - Mr. Bureaucrat
2001 - Shogun Lodge
2000 - Shogun Lodge
1999 - Melora
1998 - Might and Power
1997 - Summer Beau
1996 - Super Slew
1995 - Danewin
1994 - Durbridge
1993 - Corndale
1992 - Rough Habit
1991 - Rough Habit
1990 - Hunter
1989 - Eye Of The Sky 

‡ Not held because of the COVID-19 pandemic

See also
 List of Australian Group races
 Group races

References

Horse races in Australia
Sport on the Gold Coast, Queensland